St Oswald's Church, Castle Bolton is a Grade II* listed parish church in the Church of England located in Castle Bolton, North Yorkshire.

History

The church dates from the 14th century. The south aisle was rebuilt around 1770 and the church restored in 1853.

It is the burial place of the Metcalfe family

Parish status
The church is in a joint parish with
Thornton Rust Mission Room
St Andrew's Church, Aysgarth
St Mary's Church, Redmire
Holy Trinity Church, Wensley
St Margaret's Church, Preston-under-Scar
St Bartholomew's Church, West Witton

References

Castle Bolton
Castle Bolton